Black Market Militia is a rap group composed of Killah Priest, Timbo King, Hell Razah, Tragedy Khadafi and William Cooper. They released their first - Black Market Militia - in 2005, through Performance Records, envisioned and initiated by Mitchell Serbes, Gary Hertzan and Mariel Maffetone. They had previously released two underground mixtapes, The Black Market Vol. 1 and Vol. 2: Dead Street Scrolls.

Discography

Albums

Black Market Militia (2005)

Mixtapes
2002: The Black Market Vol. 1
2003: Vol. 2: Dead Street Scrolls
2004: Vol. 3: Underground Economy

Extended plays
2006: Black Market(w/ Brotha Lynch Hung & D-Blaze)

Hip hop groups from New York City
Musical groups established in 2005
Hip hop supergroups
Underground hip hop groups
Wu-Tang Clan affiliates